Statue of Mickey Mantle may refer to:

 Statue of Mickey Mantle (Commerce, Oklahoma)
 Statue of Mickey Mantle (Oklahoma City)